Ramat Tzvi (lit. Zvi Heights) is a moshav in north-eastern Israel. Located between Afula and Beit She'an, it falls under the jurisdiction of Gilboa Regional Council.

History
The moshav was established in 1942 and was named after Henry Tzvi Monsky, an American lawyer who was the first international president of B'nai B'rith.

References

External links
Official website

Moshavim
Populated places established in 1942
Populated places in Northern District (Israel)
1942 establishments in Mandatory Palestine